Kubojah: Parallel World I is the fifth studio album of Japanese singer Toshinobu Kubota, released on September 21, 1991.

Background
On September 9, 1991, Kubota released the lead singles "Honey B" and "Keep On Jammin'", which chart at number 15 on the Oricon Weekly Singles chart. On September 21, 1991, Kubota released Kubojah: Parallel World I. The album became Kubota's fourth album to reach number 1 on the Oricon Weekly Albums chart. On November 1, 1991, Amaoto was released the third single and chart at number 34 on the Oricon Weekly Singles chart. As of February 2012, Kubojah: Parallel World I has sold over 571,000 copies in Japan, reaching double platinum certification.

Track listing
 "Keep On Jammin'"
 "Amaoto" (Sound of Rain)
 "Honey B"
 "Love Like A Rastaman"
 "Otokotachi No Uta" (Poetry of men ~ My Yout ~)
 "Telephoto"
 "Just the 2 of Us" (featuring Caron Wheeler)
 "You Were Mine (Kubojah Version)"
 "Kami Naru Mono To Bara No Toge" (Roses and Thorns of the Divine)
 "Kitakaze To Taiyou (Bro. Hussein & Bro. Bush)" (The North Wind and The Sun (Bro. Hussein & Bro. Bush))
 "Jamaica (Kono Tamashii No Yasuragi)" (Jamaica (Peace of Soul))

Personnel
Arranged by Toshinobu Kubota
Arranged by [Background Vocals Co-arranged] – Caron Wheeler, Yoichiro Kakizaki
Backing vocals – Caron Wheeler, Chris Cameron, Fonzi Thornton, Robin Clark, Tawatha Agee, Toshinobu Kubota, Yoichiro Kakizaki
Co-producer – Chris Cameron, Jeff Bova, Yoichiro Kakizaki
Engineer [Assistant] – Shannon Carr
Engineer [Mastering] – Ted Jensen
Engineer, Mixed by Larry Alexander
Percussion – Crusher Bennett, Carol Steele, Gerardo Velez
Producer – Toshinobu Kubota
Synthesizer [Programming and performance] – Chris Cameron, Jeff Bova, Yoichiro Kakizaki
Vocal [African "hunma"] – Chris Cameron, Larry Alexander, Toshinobu Kubota, Yasuhiro "Jumbo" Sato

Charts

Oricon Sales Chart

References

1991 albums
Toshinobu Kubota albums
Sony Music albums

ja:KUBOJAH